Erie Beach is the name of two communities in the Canadian province of Ontario:

Erie Beach, Chatham-Kent,
Erie Beach, Fort Erie.

Erie Beach, Chatham-Kent was founded in 1916 and holds the status of a designated place in Canadian census data.